Valentino Clemente Ludovico Garavani (born 11 May 1932), known mononymously as Valentino, is an Italian fashion designer, the founder of the Valentino brand and company. His main lines include Valentino, Valentino Garavani, Valentino Roma, and R.E.D. Valentino.

Career

Early life and 1950s Paris years 
Valentino was born in Voghera, in the province of Pavia, Lombardy, Italy. His mother named him after screen idol Rudolph Valentino. He became interested in fashion while in primary school in his native Voghera, when he apprenticed under his aunt Rosa and local designer Ernestina Salvadeo, an aunt of noted artist Aldo Giorgini. Valentino then moved to Paris to pursue this interest with the help of his mother Teresa de Biaggi and his father Mauro Garavani. There he studied at the École des Beaux-Arts and at the Chambre Syndicale de la Couture Parisienne.

His first choice for an apprenticeship, in Paris, was Jacques Fath, then Balenciaga. He found an apprenticeship with Jean Dessès where he helped Countess Jacqueline de Ribes sketch her dress ideas. He then joined Guy Laroche for two years.

After five years, Valentino left Jean Dessès over an incident about prolonging a vacation in Saint-Tropez that still makes him uncomfortable today. Rescued by his friend Laroche, he joined his "tiny, tiny" fashion house. After discussions with his parents, he decided to return to Italy and set up in Rome in 1959, as pupil of Emilio Schuberth and then collaborated with Vincenzo Ferdinandi's atelier before opening his own fashion house.

Rome 

In 1960 Valentino left Paris and opened a fashion house in Rome on the posh Via Condotti with the backing of his father and an associate of his. More than an atelier, the premises resembled a real "maison de haute couture". Everything was very grand and models flew in from Paris for his first show. Valentino became known for his red dresses, in the bright shade that became known in the fashion industry as "Valentino red".

On 31 July 1960, Valentino met Giancarlo Giammetti at the Café de Paris on the Via Veneto in Rome. One of three children, Giammetti was in his second year of architecture school, living at home with his parents in the haut bourgeois Parioli section of Northern Rome. That day Giammetti gave Valentino a lift home in his Fiat and a friendship, as well as a long-lasting partnership, started. The day after, Giammetti was to leave for Capri for vacation and, by coincidence, Valentino was also going there, so they met again on the island 10 days later. Giammetti would shortly thereafter abandon the University to become Valentino's business and life partner. When Giammetti arrived, the business situation of Valentino's atelier was in fact not brilliant: in one year he had spent so much money that his father's associate pulled out of the business, and had to fight against bankruptcy.

Breakthrough in Florence (1962–1967) 
Valentino's international debut took place in 1962 in Florence, the Italian fashion capital of the time.

At some point in 1964, Jacqueline Kennedy had seen Gloria Schiff, the twin sister of the Rome-based fashion editor of American Vogue and Valentino's friend Consuelo Crespi, wearing a two-piece ensemble in black organza at a gathering. It made such an impression that Kennedy contacted Ms. Schiff to learn the name of the ensemble's designer, which was Valentino. In September 1964, Valentino was to be in the United States to present a collection of his work at a charity ball at New York's Waldorf-Astoria Hotel. Mrs. Kennedy wanted to view the collection but could not attend the event, so Valentino decided to send a model, sales representative and a selection of key pieces from his collection to Mrs. Kennedy's apartment on Fifth Avenue. Mrs. Kennedy ordered six of his haute couture dresses, all in black and white, and wore them during her year of mourning following President John F. Kennedy's assassination. From then on, she was a devoted client and would become a friend. Valentino would later design the white Valentino Gown worn by Kennedy at her wedding to Greek tycoon Aristotle Onassis. In 1966 he moved his shows from Florence to Rome where two years later he produced an all-white collection that became famous for the "V" logo he designed.

1970s 
Throughout the 1970s, Valentino's womenswear for both couture and ready-to-wear generally followed the trends of the time, opening the decade with an emphasis on midiskirts worn over miniskirts, fitted, knee-high boots, trousers, and some ethnic looks, mostly with a fit-and-flare silhouette. In 1971, he paired more brightly colored midis and knee-length skirts with that year's vogue for hot pants, also continuing to show trousers like culottes and knickers with the gently flared standard trouser of the time. He was noted for his tailored clothes. A forties revival was a focus for a time, and Valentino showed platform shoes, padded shoulders, and knee-length skirts, along with occasional forays into thirties and fifties styles, all kept modern by an emphasis on pants.

In 1972, he started the year favoring trousers but ended it showing only skirts, including being one of the only designers to present day dresses in a period dominated by separates. He did, though, endorse the favored full sleeves and layering that were seen on many runways and continued to move away from his trademark monotone or bicolor palette, often cream and/or red, and moved into brighter colors and prints. He did knee-length, square-shouldered forties revival again in 1973, continuing with bright prints, including a Bakst influence. During these early seventies collections, his evening styles were often ruffled and sometimes had asymmetric hems, and his V logo ranged from prominent to subtle, sometimes paving seemingly every surface, as in 1970, other times a single, barely discernible letter on a belt or scarf.

The mid-seventies move toward fuller peasant silhouettes was seen in Valentino's work somewhat – dirndl skirts, off-the-shoulder flounces, petticoats, blousons, shawls, ponchos, and layering, but he deemphasized the look's characteristic boots and was sometimes criticized for including styles that were too heavily constructed and stiff in this period of minimal construction and flowing shapes, as well as for emphasizing conspicuous-consumption wealth projection during the more egalitarian atmosphere that prevailed in the mid-seventies. He did, though, return to his serviceable presentation of monochrome and bicolor garment groupings.

With the high-fashion world's Fall 1978 move toward big shoulders, more formal suits, and a more conspicuous-consumption, 1940s-50s-retro style, Valentino presented shapes that echoed the big shoulders of the 1930s and adopted the blatantly seductive styles being favored by designers in narrow, slit skirts and black bras worn on their own under padded-shoulder jackets. Along with many other designers, he continued to show this style the following year in stiffly structured, broad-shouldered jackets and dresses presented with forties-fifties accessories like hats, gloves, and cinch belts. This padded-shoulder, high-glamour style would continue to dominate fashion into the eighties and bring Valentino unprecedented fame.

Throughout the 1970s Valentino spent considerable time in New York City, where his presence was embraced by society personalities such as Vogue'''s editor-in-chief Diana Vreeland and the art icon Andy Warhol.

 1980s 
Valentino was one of the favorite designers of actress Joan Collins, famous in the 1980s for being one of the stars of the popular US TV soap opera Dynasty, which ran from 1981 to 1989, bringing the designer additional visibility and name recognition among the public. The era's conspicuous-consumption, 1940s-50s-inspired ballgowns, cocktail dresses, and broad-shouldered, sharply tailored suits were taken up with aplomb by Valentino, whose style at the time was similar to that of Givenchy and Oscar de la Renta.

A few themes remained constant throughout his eighties collections: his familiar color groupings; his penchant for blatant displays of luxury, wealth, and opulence; broad shoulder padding; and a more comfortable cut than he was showing at the start of the big-shoulder era at the end of the seventies. He continued to show his ready-to-wear collections in Paris and his couture collections in Rome.

In the first half of the eighties, he mostly followed the short, narrow skirt line with broad-shouldered tops also followed by Saint Laurent, Givenchy, Ungaro, and others, but also presented longer, looser looks, the chemise dresses of the era, and a variety of pant shapes. During the mid-eighties, the fashion press and buyers often rated him higher than all other Paris designers, ranking him with Saint Laurent and Lagerfeld. He felt confident enough with this elevated stature that in 1985 he added his moniker to a line of designer jeans. Like other designers, he showed a variety of miniskirts throughout the eighties among his other lengths and garments, and he joined the rest of the fashion world in 1987-88 in showing almost exclusively mini lengths for two seasons and then followed his colleagues by the end of 1988 in retreating from an exclusive mini-length focus.

From 1983 to 1985, Valentino contributed a specially appointed Valentino Edition to the Continental line of US luxury automaker Lincoln.

 The Accademia Valentino 
1990 marked the opening of the Accademia Valentino, designed by architect Tommaso Ziffer, a cultural space located near Valentino's atelier in Rome, for the presentation of art exhibitions. The next year, encouraged by their friend Elizabeth Taylor, Valentino Garavani and Giancarlo Giammetti created L.I.F.E., an association for the support of AIDS-related patients, which benefits from the activities of the Accademia Valentino.

 From HdP group to Marzotto group 
In 1998 Valentino and his partner Giancarlo Giammetti sold the company for approximately US$300 million to HdP, an Italian conglomerate controlled, in part, by the late Gianni Agnelli, the head of Fiat. In 2002, Valentino S.p.A., with revenues of more than $180 million, was sold by HdP to Marzotto Apparel, a Milan-based textile giant, for $210 million. Maison Valentino is controlled since 2012 by Mayhoola for Investments S.P.C., a holding company sustained by a group of private investors from Qatar. It is present in over 90 countries through 160 Valentino directly operated boutiques and over 1300 points of sale.

 Retirement 

On 4 September 2007, Valentino announced that he would retire fully in January 2008 from the world stage after his last haute couture show in Paris. He delivered his last women's ready-to-wear show in Paris on 4 October.

His last haute couture show was presented in Paris at the Musée Rodin on 23 January 2008. It was, however, somewhat marred by his criticism of fellow Italian design duo Dolce & Gabbana, and the death of Australian actor Heath Ledger, although few allowed these things to detract from his final show, which received a standing ovation from the entire audience that included hundreds of notable names from all areas of show business. Many models returned to attend Valentino's last haute couture show; the audience included Eva Herzigová, Naomi Campbell, Claudia Schiffer, Nadja Auermann, Karolína Kurková and Karen Mulder.

In September 2007, Valentino decided to leave the Creative Direction of his brand. Maria Grazia Chiuri and Pierpaolo Piccioli were first nominated Creative Directors of all accessories lines, and the following year, they were appointed Creative Directors of Valentino, guiding all collections, from Prêt-à-Porter to Haute Couture. In June 2015 the Creative Directors were bestowed with the prestigious CFDA International Award, recognition that paid homage to the professional path and to the success of the Maison. On 7 July 2016 Maison Valentino nominated Pierpaolo Piccioli its sole Creative Director of the Maison.

 Movies 

In 2006 Valentino appeared in a cameo role, as himself, in the hit movie The Devil Wears Prada.Valentino: The Last Emperor a feature-length documentary film on the designer, premiered at the 2008 Venice International Film Festival. Produced and directed by Matt Tyrnauer, special correspondent for Vanity Fair magazine, the film follows Valentino and his inner circle throughout various events, including last year's anniversary show celebrating his 45-year career.

During the movie's production from June 2005 to July 2007, the filmmakers shot more than 250 hours of footage with exclusive, unprecedented access to Valentino and his entourage. "We were let in to the inner circle, but we had to stick it out for a long time, practically move in, to capture the truly great moments", says Tyrnauer. "Valentino is surrounded by a tight-knit family of friends and employees, but, eventually, their guard came down and they forgot there was a camera crew in the room." The film had its North American premiere at the 2008 Toronto International Film Festival. It was released theatrically in the United States on 18 March in New York City and selected cities.

 Honors 
On 6 July 2006, France's President Chirac awarded Valentino the Chevalier de la Légion d'honneur. During the festivities for the 45th year of Valentino's career, the Mayor of Rome, Walter Veltroni, announced that the site of the Valentino Museum would be a building in via San Teodoro in Rome, between the Palatine Hill and the Bocca della Verità. On 24 January 2008, Valentino was presented with the Medal of the City of Paris for his services to fashion in the city where he was educated.

On 7 September 2011, Valentino was presented with the sixth annual Couture Council Award for Artistry of Fashion from the Museum at the Fashion Institute of Technology at a benefit luncheon held at the David H. Koch Theater, Lincoln Center in New York City.

In 2017, Valentino was the recipient of the Golden Plate Award of the American Academy of Achievement. His Golden Plate was presented by Awards Council member Jeremy Irons.

 Home decoration 

Valentino and his associate Giancarlo Giammetti share homes and apartments around the world including the following:

 Villa on the Via Appia Antica, an historical landmark in Rome bought in 1972. The villa is decorated by Renzo Mongiardino and Adrian Magistretti with influences of China, Italy, and France.
 19th century mansion in Holland Park, London. The centerpiece of this mansion is the grand salon that houses five late Picassos and a small salon with two Basquiats and one painting by Damien Hirst.
 Penthouse on Fifth Avenue, New York near the Frick Museum overlooking Central Park decorated by Jacques Grange with paintings by Richard Prince, Jean-Michel Basquiat, Roy Lichtenstein, Andy Warhol, Willem de Kooning and Fernand Léger.
 , a castle in the communes of Crespières – Davron near Paris, France. A 17th-century residence outside Paris, Château of Wideville was built by Louis XIII's finance minister and later home to one of Louis XIV's mistresses. Valentino acquired the eight-bedroom castle in 1995 and commissioned its restoration to the eminent interior decorator Henri Samuel. The castle comprises 280-acre gardens designed by Wirtz International, a pigeonnier tower, a pavilion containing a shell grotto, a building housing the archives of Valentino Garavani Archives. The chateau stairway is flanked by stone dogs carved in the 17th century by the French artist Jacques Sarazin. Valentino stages always organizes a theme party at the castle during the fashion weeks in Paris.
 Chalet Gifferhorn in Gstaad, Switzerland where he spends winter celebrations. The house has paintings of Arcimboldo and the famous sheep-shaped furniture by les Lalanne.
Valentino also spends half of his time in Giancarlo Giammetti's homes:
 18th-century Villa "La Vagnola" in Cetona, Tuscany which Giancarlo Giammetti purchased in 1986. Renowned Italian decorator Renzo Mongiardino created enchanted interiors inspired by the villa's classical gardens. For twenty-five years Giancarlo Giammetti and Valentino vacationed here to escape the pressures of Rome and their international jet set lifestyle.

Portions of the property date back to the 16th-century but it was in 1750, on the occasion of his marriage to Maria Antonietta Vagnoli, that the nobleman Sallustio Terrosi started building the villa. The villa's decoration includes Empire pieces and Chinese wooden figurines which once adorned the Royal Pavilion at Brighton and Empire settee that belonged to Princess Mathilde, Napoleon's niece, 2,100 rare books that Giammetti miraculously returned to the villa, missing since the 1960s. The design of the spare all-white kitchen was given to one of Giammetti's friends, architect Tommaso Ziffer, a young decorator at the time.

The "Sophia Loren" guest room was so named in honor of the room's inaugural guest, richly appointed in Old World style with a lacy ceiling designed by Mongiardino. Paolo Peyrone, a pupil of the English landscape designer Russell Page, assisted with the design of the landscaping around the house. The 18th-century stable, as it was photographed in the 1980s, became an orangery with an upstairs exercise room. The villa has a pool pavilion named "La Turkerie" standing in the middle of the garden was built by the Terrosi-Vagnoli family in 1837 in honor of a visiting pasha.
 Penthouse on the Quai d'Orsay in Paris, decorated by Peter Marino with a collection of modern art including two Andy Warhol Lenin's, one red and one black, Rothko, Cy Twombly, Francis Bacon and George Dyer. The furniture includes pieces by Jean-Michel Frank, les Lalanne, Eileen Gray, Émile-Jacques Ruhlmann and Ariane Dandois.
 Apartment in Kensington, London.
 Penthouse in New York decorated by designer Jacques Grange and filled with works by Picasso, Cy Twombly, David Hockney, Jean-Michel Basquiat, and Richard Prince, Rachel Feinstein and Mark Rothko painting. The apartment comprises a pair of Tang-dynasty horses, a gilt-bronze crocodile chair by les Lalanne, a sculpture by Anselm Kiefer.
 Penthouse in Via Condotti, Rome

 Personal life 

In the film Valentino: The Last Emperor, Valentino and Giancarlo Giammetti discuss how they met on 30 July 1960 in Via Veneto, the epicenter of Rome's Dolce Vita. They have been together ever since, for more than 50 years, although their love relationship ended in 1972. As told by Giancarlo in his private memoirs, in 1973 Valentino met nineteen-year-old Carlos Souza at the Hippopotamus club in Rio de Janeiro, dating him until Carlos married Brazilian socialite Charlene Shorto in 1983. Valentino and Giancarlo later became the godfathers of Charlene and Carlos' sons, Sean and Anthony. Carlos and Charlene worked as PR for the Maison Valentino even after their divorce in 1990, and have kept a close relationship ever since.

As narrated in "Private" by Giancarlo Giammetti, Valentino in the early 1980s met his current boyfriend Bruce Hoeksema, who started as a model at Valentino to later become the vice president of the Maison. Giancarlo Giammetti said that he and Valentino together with Carlos, Charlene and Bruce form a real family. Part of this enlarged family called the "tribe" is also composed by Spanish Duchess Nati Abascal, French-Brazilian Princess Georgina Brandolini d'Adda and Valentino PR Daniela Giardina.

Valentino's mother, Teresa, moved from Voghera to Rome to help with the business. Eventually he told both his parents that he was engaged to Italian actress Marilù Tolo, the only woman he had ever truly loved and with whom he had wished to have children.

Valentino and Giammetti's lifestyle has been considered flamboyant. John Fairchild, editor-at-large at Women's Wear Daily and W, told Vanity Fair'',

Valentino adores dogs to the point that he once named a second line of clothing after his late pug Oliver. Today Valentino owns six pugs. When traveling on his 14-seat Challenger jet, three cars are needed to move Valentino and his entourage to the airport: one to move Valentino and Giammetti, another for the luggage and the staff, and a third to transport five of six Valentino's pugs as one of them, Maude, always travels with Valentino.

See also 
Thomas Ammann
Jacqueline de Ribes
Love Ball

References

External links 

 Official website for Valentino: The Last Emperor  documentary film
Petiterobe Blog – Valentino Garavani – The history of a brand, Petiterobe.ae
 

1932 births
Fashion designers from Rome
Italian LGBT people
LGBT fashion designers
Italian fashion designers
Living people
People from Voghera
Chevaliers of the Légion d'honneur
École des Beaux-Arts alumni
People named in the Panama Papers
Valentino (fashion house)